Manuéla Kéclard-Mondésir (born 6 May 1971) is a French politician who has represented Martinique's 2nd constituency on the National Assembly since 2018.

References 

Living people
1971 births
Deputies of the 15th National Assembly of the French Fifth Republic
21st-century French politicians
21st-century French women politicians
Women members of the National Assembly (France)
Martiniquais politicians
French people of Martiniquais descent
Black French politicians